John Monteith is a British scientist.

John Monteith may also refer to:
John Monteith (actor) (?–2018), American actor
John Monteith (footballer) (1883–1918), Scottish footballer
 John Monteith (minister) (1788–1868), co-founder of the University of Michigan
John Monteith (Wisconsin politician) (1829–1901), Wisconsin politician
John C. Monteith (1853–1940), Canadian politician